Yandoit is a town in Victoria, Australia.

The Yandoit area was first settled by Captain John Stuart Hepburn.  Alluvial gold was discovered in 1854 and 5,000 miners came to the area creating a gold rush. The gold soon ran out and deep lead mining started in 1858.  The town was surveyed in 1861 when it had a population of 232. Despite its population declining to 77 in 1881, Yandoit was proclaimed a township in 1885.

Many Swiss Italians settled in Yandoit and built many of the remaining stone buildings.

Gallery

References

External links

Community website

Towns in Victoria (Australia)